Jerrold von Wedel (1921 - July 18, 1963) was an American heart surgeon who studied methods of using a skin flap graft to revascularize  a diseased heart, as well as  multiple sclerosis, which ultimately killed him. Served in the United States Navy as lieutenant in Japan 1945-1947. He was a faculty member at the University of Puerto Rico School of Medicine.

He died in 1963, at the age of 42 at the San Juan Veterans Administration Medical Center and was buried at Sleepy Hollow Cemetery in North Tarrytown, Mount Pleasant, Westchester, New York, United States., his widow established a cardiovascular research fund at the University of Puerto Rico.

References

External links
 

Burials at Sleepy Hollow Cemetery
Dartmouth College alumni
Columbia University Vagelos College of Physicians and Surgeons alumni
United States Navy officers
University of Puerto Rico faculty
1921 births
1963 deaths
American expatriates in Japan